África Zamorano Sanz (born 11 January 1998) is a Spanish swimmer. She competed in the women's 200 metre individual medley event at the 2016 Summer Olympics. She competed in the women's 200 metre individual medley, 200 metre backstroke, and 4 × 100 metre medley relay at the 2020 Summer Olympics in Tokyo, Japan.

References

External links
 

1998 births
Living people
Spanish female backstroke swimmers
Spanish female freestyle swimmers
Spanish female medley swimmers
Swimmers from Barcelona
Olympic swimmers of Spain
Swimmers at the 2016 Summer Olympics
Swimmers at the 2020 Summer Olympics
Swimmers at the 2014 Summer Youth Olympics
Mediterranean Games silver medalists for Spain
Mediterranean Games bronze medalists for Spain
Mediterranean Games medalists in swimming
Swimmers at the 2018 Mediterranean Games
Swimmers at the 2022 Mediterranean Games
20th-century Spanish women
21st-century Spanish women